Nicotiana plumbaginifolia is a species of tobacco plant  known as Tex-Mex tobacco. The species epithet, "plumbaginifolia", is from the leaves bearing similarity to those of the genus Plumbago.

References

plumbaginifolia
Tobacco